Members of the New South Wales Legislative Council who served from 1891 to 1894 were appointed for life by the Governor on the advice of the Premier. This list includes members between the elections commencing on 17 June 1891 and the election on 17 July 1894. The President was Sir John Hay until his death on 10 January 1892 and then Sir John Lackey.

Although a loose party system had emerged in the Legislative Assembly at this time, there was no real party structure in the Council.

See also
Third Dibbs ministry

Notes

References

 

Members of New South Wales parliaments by term
19th-century Australian politicians